The Rise and Fall of the Third Stream is an album by Joe Zawinul, released in 1968. The title refers to the Third stream genre of music, melding classical and jazz.

Track listing 
 "Baptismal" (William Fischer) – 7:37
 "The Soul of a Village - Part I" (William Fischer) – 2:13
 "The Soul of a Village - Part II" (William Fischer) – 4:12
 "The Fifth Canto" (William Fischer) – 6:55
 "From Vienna, With Love" (Friedrich Gulda) – 4:27
 "Lord, Lord, Lord" (William Fischer) – 3:55
 "A Concerto, Retitled" (William Fischer) – 5:30

Personnel 
Joe Zawinul - Piano and electric piano
William S. Fischer - Tenor Saxophone and arrangements
Jimmy Owens - Trumpet
Alfred Brown - Viola
Selwart Clarke - Viola
Theodore Israel - Viola
Kermit Moore - Cello
Richard Davis - Bass
Roy McCurdy - Drums
Freddie Waits - Drums
Warren Smith - Percussion

References

Joe Zawinul albums
1968 albums
Albums produced by Joel Dorn
Vortex Records albums